The R438 road is a regional road in Ireland linking the N62 road south of Cloghan, County Offaly with the N65 road two kilometers north of Borrisokane in  County Tipperary.

See also
Roads in Ireland
National primary road
National secondary road

References
Roads Act 1993 (Classification of Regional Roads) Order 2006 – Department of Transport

Regional roads in the Republic of Ireland
Roads in County Offaly
Roads in County Tipperary